Radhanagar is a village in the Udhwa CD block in the Rajmahal subdivision of the Sahibganj district in the Indian state of Jharkhand.

Geography

Location                                          

Overview
Rajmahal coalfield is shown in the map. The entire area is overwhelmingly rural with only small pockets of urbanisation.

Note: The full screen map is interesting. All places marked on the map are linked and you can easily move on to another page of your choice. Enlarge the map to see what else is there – one gets railway links, many more road links and so on.

Demographics
According to the 2011 Census of India, Radhanagar a total population of 6,330, of which 3,224 (51%) were males and 3,106 (49%) were females. Population in the age range 0–6 years was 1,267. The total number of literate persons in Radhanagar was 2,274 (44.91% of the population over 6 years).

Civic administration

Police station
Radhanagar police station serves the Udhwa CD block.

Education
Radhanagar High School is a Hindi-medium coeducational institution established in 1966. It has facilities for teaching in classes IX and X.

References

Villages in Sahibganj district